The 1996 Samoa rugby union tour of Great Britain and Ireland was a series of matches played in November and December 1996 in British Isles by Samoa national rugby union team.

Results
Scores and results list Samoa's points tally first.

References 

 

1996 rugby union tours
1996
1996 in Oceanian rugby union
rugby union
1996–97 in European rugby union
1996–97 in Irish rugby union
1996–97 in Welsh rugby union
1996–97 in English rugby union
1996–97 in British rugby union
1996
1996
1996
1996